Acalabrutinib, sold under the brand name Calquence, is a medication used to treat various types of non-Hodgkin lymphoma, including mantle cell lymphoma (MCL) and chronic lymphocytic leukemia/small lymphocytic leukemia (CLL/SLL).  It may be used both in relapsed as well as in treatment-naive settings.

Common side effects include headaches, feeling tired, low red blood cells, low platelets, and low white blood cells. It is a second generation Bruton's tyrosine kinase inhibitor. Acalabrutinib blocks an enzyme called Bruton's tyrosine kinase, which helps B cells to survive and grow. By blocking this enzyme, acalabrutinib is expected to slow down the build-up of cancerous B cells in CLL, thereby delaying progression of the cancer.

Acalabrutinib was approved for medical use in the United States in 2017, and in the European Union in November 2020.

Medical uses
In the European Union, acalabrutinib as monotherapy or in combination with obinutuzumab is indicated for the treatment of adults with previously untreated chronic lymphocytic leukaemia (CLL). It is also indicated for the treatment of adults with chronic lymphocytic leukaemia (CLL) who have received at least one prior therapy.

In the United States, acalabrutinib is indicated for the treatment of adults with mantle cell lymphoma (MCL) who have received at least one prior therapy, and for the treatment of adults with chronic lymphocytic leukemia (CLL) or small lymphocytic lymphoma (SLL).

Side effects
The most common adverse events were headache, diarrhea and weight gain. Despite the appearance of a greater occurrence of transient headaches, data suggest a preferred advantage of acalabrutinib over ibrutinib due to expected reduced adverse events of skin rash, severe diarrhea, and bleeding risk.

Society and culture

Legal status 
Acalabrutinib was approved for medical use in the United States in 2017, and in the European Union in November 2020.

As of February 2016, acalabrutinib had received orphan drug designation in the United States for mantle cell lymphoma and chronic lymphocytic leukemia (CLL),
 and was similarly designated as an orphan medicinal product by the European Medicines Agency (EMA) Committee for Orphan Medicinal Products (COMP) for treatment of three indications: CLL/small lymphocytic lymphoma (SLL), mantle cell lymphoma (MCL), and lymphoplasmacytic lymphoma (Waldenström's macroglobulinaemia, WM). Approval would result in a 10-year period of market exclusivity for the stated indications within Europe.

Economics 
It was developed by Acerta Pharma. After promising results for CLL in initial clinical trials, Astra Zeneca purchased a 55% stake in Acerta Pharma for $4 billion in December 2015, with an option to acquire the remaining 45% stake for an additional $3 billion, conditional on approval in both the US and Europe and the establishment of commercial opportunity.

Names
Acalabrutinib is the international nonproprietary name (INN), and the United States Adopted Name (USAN).

Research 
Relative to ibrutinib, acalabrutinib demonstrated higher selectivity and inhibition of the targeted activity of BTK, while having a much greater IC50 or otherwise virtually no inhibition on the kinase activities of ITK, EGFR, ERBB2, ERBB4, JAK3, BLK, FGR, FYN, HCK, LCK, LYN, SRC, and YES1. In addition, in platelets treated with ibrutinib, thrombus formation was clearly inhibited while no impact to thrombus formation was  identified relative to controls for those treated with acalabrutinib. These findings strongly suggest an improved safety profile of acalabrutinib with minimized adverse effects relative to ibrutinib. In pre-clinical studies, it was shown to be more potent and selective than ibrutinib, the first-in-class BTK inhibitor.

The interim results of the still on-going first human phase I/II clinical trial (NCT02029443) with 61 patients for the treatment of relapsed chronic lymphocytic leukemia (CLL) are encouraging, with a 95% overall response rate demonstrating potential to become a best-in-class treatment for CLL. Notably, a 100% response rate was achieved for those people which were positive for the 17p13.1 gene deletion, a subgroup that typically results in a poor response to therapy and expected outcomes.

References

External links 
 
 
 

Antineoplastic drugs
Human proteins
Tyrosine kinase inhibitors
AstraZeneca brands
Alkyne derivatives
Orphan drugs